SM UC-4 was a German Type UC I minelayer submarine or U-boat in the German Imperial Navy during World War I. The U-boat had been ordered by November 1914 and was launched on 6 June 1915. She was commissioned into the German Imperial Navy on 10 June 1915 as SM UC-4. Mines laid by UC-4 in her 73 patrols were credited with sinking 36 ships. UC-4 was scuttled off the coast of Flanders during the German evacuation on 5 October 1918.

Design
A German Type UC I submarine, UC-4 had a displacement of  when at the surface and  while submerged. The submarine was powered by one Daimler-Motoren-Gesellschaft six-cylinder, four-stroke diesel engine producing , an electric motor producing , and one propeller shaft.

UC-4 was fitted with six  mine tubes, twelve UC 120 mines, and one  machine gun. She was built by AG Vulcan Stettin and her complement was fourteen crew members.

Summary of raiding history

References

Notes

Citations

Bibliography

 
 

German Type UC I submarines
U-boats commissioned in 1915
World War I submarines of Germany
U-boats scuttled in 1918
Maritime incidents in 1918
1915 ships
World War I minelayers of Germany
Ships built in Hamburg